Tapz Gallantino, (born Tapiwa Mutingwende) . He won the MTV Europe Music Award for best New Zealand act in November 2017. He performed at the ARIA Music Awards of 2015. The entertainer has shared the stage with performers such as Lorde, Banks, G-Eazy, Lunice, ASAP Ferg, Danny Brown, Jeremih and Hermitude.

Background
Tapz migrated to New Zealand when he was 10 years old, then migrated to the US when he was 19.

Discography

Extended plays

Singles
"Killa" (produced by Mzwetwo, Tapz & JRMN) (#2 Spotify USA Viral Charts, No. 3 Spotify Global Viral Charts)
"Shadow" (#20 AUS, No. 1 BELIZE)
"The Buzz" Hermitude featuring Mataya & Young Tapz (2015) (#20 AUS, No. 13 USA)

Awards and nominations

ARIA Music Awards
The ARIA Music Awards is an annual awards ceremony that recognises excellence, innovation, and achievement across all genres of Australian music. They commenced in 1987. 

! 
|-
| 2015
| Kess Broekman-Dattner for Hermitude featuring Young Tapz "Through the Roof"
| Best Video
| 
|  
|-

References

External links 
 Young Tapz

1995 births
Living people
21st-century New Zealand male singers